Club Deportivo Serverense is a Spanish football team based in Son Servera, in the Balearic Islands. Founded in 1933, it plays in Regional Preferente de Mallorca, holding home matches at Camp Municipal Ses Eres, with a capacity of 800 people.

History
Founded in 1993, as CD Serverense, the club absorbed Recreativo Serverense (a club dedicated to youth football only) in the 1970s. In 1981, Serverense merged with CF Atlético Badia de Llevant (a club created a year before), and changed its name to CD Badia Cala Millor San Servera.

In their first year CD Badia Cala Millor achieved promotion to Tercera División, and five years later it reached Segunda División B. After changing the club's name to CD Cala Millor in 1988, it suffered administrative relegation and went further down to the regional leagues in 1996.

In 2006 the club changed name back to, CD Serverense. It returned to the fourth tier in 2007 and 2017, suffering relegation in both seasons.

Season to season

Old CD Serverense

CF Atlético Badia de Llevant

CD Badia Cala Millor

CD Cala Millor

CD Serverense

2 seasons in Segunda División B
14 seasons in Tercera División

References

External links
ArefePedia profile (Cala Millor) 
ArefePedia profile (Serverense) 

Football clubs in the Balearic Islands
Sport in Mallorca
Association football clubs established in 1933
1933 establishments in Spain